Congress Jananayaka Peravai (Congress Democratic Front) was a political party in the Indian state of Tamil Nadu. It was founded in 2001 by  former union finance minister P. Chidambaram, as a splinter group of the Tamil Maanila Congress, when the TMC allied itself with the All India Anna Dravida Munnetra Kazhagam. 2001 Tamil Nadu Legislative Assembly election P. Chidambaram other side Party DMK-BJP (NDA) Joint Meet to Assembly election.   

In the 2004 Lok Sabha elections Chidambaram ran as the Indian National Congress candidate from Sivagangai, and won with 400 393 votes (60,01%).

On 25 November 2004 CJP merged into the Indian National Congress. Discussions about a merger had taken place during a long time, but the merger was resisted by the Tamil Nadu Congress leadership. In the end the merger was pushed through by the national Congress leadership.

See also
Indian National Congress breakaway parties

References

Defunct political parties in Tamil Nadu
2001 establishments in Tamil Nadu
Political parties established in 2001
Political parties disestablished in 2004
Indian National Congress breakaway groups